The Men's team large hill competition at the FIS Nordic World Ski Championships 2021 was held on 6 March 2021.

Results
The first round was started at 17:00 and the final round at 18:16.

References

Men's team large hill